Mircea Ilcu (born 1 April 1991 in Timișoara) is a Romanian Canadian soccer player.

Career

Youth and amateur
Ilcu moved from Romania to Canada with his family as a small child, settling in Vaudreuil-Dorion, Quebec. He attended Ecole Secondaire de la Cité-des-Jeunes and played college soccer at John Abbott College. He played for Équipe du Québec (the Quebec provincial team) between 2004 and 2006.  Also played for the Quebec team at the 2009 Canada Games.

Ilcu began his career playing for amateur side Lakers du Lac Saint-Louis, and later played in the Canadian Soccer League for Trois-Rivières Attak in 2009 and Montreal Impact Academy in 2010 & 2012.

Professional
Ilcu made his debut for Montreal Impact (NASL) in the North American Soccer League on 9 April 2011.

Career stats

Personal life
Ilcu's father Mihai was also a footballer who played for FC Politehnica Timișoara in the 1980s. His niece Marieta is a former long jumper.

References

External links 
 
 
 Trois-Rivières Attak bio
 Sniper plays game for keeps—Interview

1991 births
Living people
Canadian Soccer League (1998–present) players
Romanian footballers
Trois-Rivières Attak players
Montreal Impact (1992–2011) players
North American Soccer League players
Romanian emigrants to Canada
Montreal Impact U23 players
Association football forwards
Sportspeople from Timișoara